Juxtaxanthias is a genus of crabs in the family Xanthidae, containing the following species:

 Juxtaxanthias intonsus (Randall, 1840)
 Juxtaxanthias lividus (Latrielle, 1812)
 Juxtaxanthias tetradon (Heller, 1862)

References

Xanthoidea